The Federal Agency for Medicines and Health Products (FAMHP) of Belgium is responsible for the approval and registration of new medication in Belgium and for pharmacovigilance. Xavier De Cuyper is General Administrator of the agency.

The Dutch name is Federaal Agentschap voor Geneesmiddelen en Gezondheidsproducten (FAGG) and in French it is called Agence Fédérale des Médicaments et des Produits de Santé (AFMPS).

The agency succeeded the Directoraat-generaal Geneesmiddelen / Direction Générale des Médicaments of the Federal Public Service Health as the new Competent Authority on 1 January 2007.

See also
 European Medicines Agency (Europe)
 Food and Drug Administration (USA)

External links
 Official site

Medical and health organisations based in Belgium
Medicines and Health Products
Pharmaceutical industry
National agencies for drug regulation
Regulators of biotechnology products
Drugs in Belgium
Regulation in Belgium